Raimondo Prinoth (21 October 1944 – 21 July 2006) was an Italian luger who competed during the 1960s. He won the silver medal in the men's doubles event at the 1961 FIL World Luge Championships in Girenbad, Switzerland. He also competed at the 1968 Winter Olympics.

References

External links
Hickok sports information on World champions in luge and skeleton.

1944 births
2006 deaths
Italian male lugers
Olympic lugers of Italy
Lugers at the 1968 Winter Olympics